Skyline is a 1931 American Pre-Code drama film directed by Sam Taylor and starring silent film veteran Thomas Meighan. It is based on a novel—East Side, West Side—by Felix Riesenberg. It was produced and released by Fox Film Corporation.

Cast
Thomas Meighan – Gordon A. McClellan
Hardie Albright – John Breen
Maureen O'Sullivan – Kathleen Kearny
Myrna Loy – Paula Lambert
Stanley Fields – Captain Breen
Jack Kennedy – Kearny
Robert McWade – Judge West
Don Dillaway – Gerry Gaige
Alice Ward – Mrs. Kearny
Dorothy Peterson – Rose Breen

References

External links
Skyline at IMDb.com

lobby poster

1931 films
Films directed by Sam Taylor
Fox Film films
Films based on American novels
1931 drama films
1930s English-language films
1930s American films